Balushi may be:
 an alternative spelling of Baluchi
 Al-Balushi, a surname

See also 
 Belushi (disambiguation)